Balkh District is a district in Balkh province, Afghanistan.

References

Districts of Balkh Province